The 2021 Men's Asian Squash Team Championships was the 20th edition of Asian men's team championship for squash players. The event was held at National Squash Centre in Kuala Lumpur, Malaysia, from 30 November to 4 December 2021.

Participating teams and seeds

Group stage

Pool A

Pool B

Second round

Ninth to twelfth places

9th-12th semifinals

11th place playoff

9th place playoff

Fifth to eighth places

5th-8th semifinals

7th place playoff

5th place playoff

Knockout stage

Semifinals

Finals

Final rankings 

Source:

Draws: 

Matches: 

Players: 

Result:

See also
 Asian Team Squash Championships
 2021 Women's Asian Team Squash Championships

References

2021 in squash
Squash in Asia
International sports competitions hosted by Malaysia
Squash tournaments in Malaysia
2021 in Malaysian sport